Kiss Through a Wall is a 2011 sci-fi comedy-drama film film directed by Vartan Akopyan, starring Anton Shagin and Karina Andolenko.

Plot
Innoktentiy is a loser who lives in a rented apartment with a drug addict, Kondratiev. Kesha works for his uncle, the magician-charlatan. His uncle fires him, and the landlady wants to get rid of them, there is no money except the last twenty rubles. However, Kesha falls in love with the young and daring journalist Alisa. But he is just an information source for her and nothing more. When wandering aimlessly along the lanes of night Moscow, Kesha gets a gift - to pass through walls, from the vagabond, who begs for his last twenty rubles. Now he can take food without opening a refrigerator, get into the apartments of the most unexpected people, he instantly grows rich. But wealth can not give him Alisa. Kesha goes to the most inconceivable tricks, but all his adventures prove that no supernatural abilities in love can help.

In despair, he climbs onto the Ostankino tower and breaks off with her in front of Alice. She falls unconscious and gets to the hospital, and Kesha gets off with a slight fright. In the hospital, Kesha learns that his little friend Sasha, whom he often visited, is very sick. An operation for $150,000 is required. He brings money for the treatment of the girl, and then Alisa realizes that she loves him.

Cast
 Anton Shagin as Kesha
 Karina Andolenko as Alisa Pavlovskaya, a journalist
 Pavel Volya as Rastaman Kondratiev
 Aleksandr Adabashyan as Yarilo Kartashov
 Mikhail Tarabukin as Vadik, Alisa's boyfriend
 Ivan Okhlobystin as a vagabond wizard
 Sergey Gazarov as Victor Pilsudsky, editor
 Svetlana Nemolyaeva as Alisa's grandmother
 Olga Tumaykina as Yadviga, landlady
 Tatiana Abramova as Rosa, secretary
 Soso Pavliashvili as cameo
 Mikhail Evlanov as episode
 Ametkhan Magomedov as episode

References

External links

2010s science fiction comedy-drama films
2011 romantic comedy-drama films
Russian science fiction comedy-drama films
Russian romantic comedy-drama films
2011 comedy-drama films
2011 films
Science fiction romance films